John Vernon Diener (January 23, 1887 – May 29, 1937) was mayor of Green Bay, Wisconsin.

Biography
Diener was born in Baraboo, Wisconsin, in 1887. He graduated from Notre Dame Law School before moving to Green Bay.  Diener later practiced law with future U.S. Representative Thomas F. Konop. In 1914, Diener married Margaret Wigman. They had six children. During World War I, he served as an officer in the United States Army with the 119th Infantry Regiment of the 30th Infantry Division. Diener died in 1937.

Political career
Diener was mayor from 1929 to 1937. Previously, he was an unsuccessful candidate for district attorney of Brown County, Wisconsin. He was a Democrat.

References

People from Baraboo, Wisconsin
Mayors of Green Bay, Wisconsin
Wisconsin Democrats
Wisconsin lawyers
Military personnel from Wisconsin
United States Army officers
United States Army personnel of World War I
Notre Dame Law School alumni
1887 births
1937 deaths
20th-century American politicians
20th-century American lawyers